A constitutional referendum was held in the Republic of the Congo on 8 December 1963. The new constitution created a one-party state and set the presidential term limit at two terms. It was approved by 86% of voters, with a 91.7% turnout.

Results

References

1963 referendums
1963
1963 in the Republic of the Congo
Constitutional referendums in the Republic of the Congo